Automolis meteus is a moth of the family Erebidae. It was described by Stoll in 1782. It is found in Lesotho, Somalia and South Africa.

The larvae feed on Poaceae species, as well as Trema bracteolata, Gnidia, Acalypha and Lasiosiphon species.

References

Syntomini
Moths described in 1782
Fauna of Somalia
Erebid moths of Africa